Miyako may refer to:

Places in Japan
Miyako, Iwate, a city in Iwate Prefecture
Miyako Islands
Miyako Island
Miyakojima, Okinawa, a city of the Miyako Islands
Miyako, Fukuoka, a town in Fukuoka Prefecture
Miyako and Kyō no Miyako, former names of Kyoto

Other use
Miyako (given name)
Miyako language, a Ryukyuan dialect spoken on Miyako Island and other nearby islands
Miyako Pony, a breed of pony originating from Miyako island in Japan
Japanese cruiser Miyako, an unprotected cruiser of the Imperial Japanese navy
Miyako (brand), a consumer electronics brand from DKI Jakarta, Indonesia.